Bromyard railway station was a station in Bromyard, Herefordshire, England. The station was opened on 22 October 1877 and closed after the last train on 5 September 1964.

References

Further reading

Disused railway stations in Herefordshire
Railway stations in Great Britain opened in 1877
Railway stations in Great Britain closed in 1964
Former Great Western Railway stations
Beeching closures in England
Bromyard